The 1963 Penn Quakers football team was an American football team that represented the University of Pennsylvania during the 1963 NCAA University Division football season. Penn finished last in the Ivy League. 

In their fourth year under head coach John Stiegman, the Quakers compiled a 3–6 record and were outscored 189 to 97. Fred Jaffin was the team captain.

Penn's 1–6 conference record was the worst in the Ivy League. The Quakers were outscored 183 to 43 by Ivy opponents. 

Penn played its home games at Franklin Field adjacent to the university's campus in Philadelphia, Pennsylvania.

Schedule

References

Penn
Penn Quakers football seasons
Penn Quakers football